Brett Harris Wigdortz OBE (born in 1973) is the Founder and Honorary President of Teach First, an educational charity working to break the link between low family income and poor educational attainment in England and Wales. He was CEO of Teach First from its launch in 2002 until October 2017. He is originally from Ocean Township, New Jersey, United States and is a dual US/UK citizen.
 
He is co-founder and a trustee of Teach For All, an organization created with Wendy Kopp (who also founded Teach For America in 1989) to help social entrepreneurs in other countries start similar programs and create a global network of social enterprises dedicated to addressing educational disadvantage. On 12 July 2018 he was appointed as the chair of the National Citizen Service Trust. 

He is currently the co-founder and CEO of tiney.co, a digital B-corp focused on at-home childcare. 

Wigdortz was a trustee of the National College for Digital Skills and Future Leaders, which recruits and trains headteachers for urban secondary schools.

Education and career
Wigdortz grew up in Ocean Township, Monmouth County, New Jersey. he graduated with an Honours bachelor's degree in Economics and International Studies: Politics and Diplomacy from the University of Richmond in Richmond, Virginia in 1995, and a master's degree in Economics from the University of Hawaii and a Masters Certificate in Asian Studies from the East-West Center in 1997.

While studying at the University of Hawaii, he worked as a researcher at the East-West Centre in Honolulu, focusing on energy and economic development issues in Southeast Asia and Pacific Islands. He co-authored a paper on future Asian energy flows ("China and Central Asia's Volatile Mix: Energy, Trade, and Ethnic Relations") and consulted for the State of Hawaii.

During 1998, he worked as a journalist in Indonesia and Hong Kong, covering the Asian economic crisis and political changes in Indonesia. In 1999, he went on to develop South East Asia policy and business programmes at the Asia Society in New York City. In 2000, Wigdortz joined McKinsey & Company as a consultant in Indonesia, Singapore, and the Philippines, focusing on retail banking, organisational effectiveness, and Asian microfinance.

In August 2001, Wigdortz transferred to McKinsey's London office and was placed on a pro bono study for business organisations London First and Business in the Community to look at how their business members could help improve results in London schools. It was during this project that he wrote the original business plan for Teach First and then took what was originally planned as a six-month leave of absence in February 2002 to develop and build support for the idea.

Founding Teach First
In July 2002, Teach First officially launched in Canary Wharf, with a team of 11 employees and with Stephen O'Brien CBE and George Iacobescu CBE as co-chairs of the Board of Trustees. After the launch, Wigdortz continued to lead the organisation as CEO.

In 2007, Wigdortz was named the UK Ernst & Young Social Entrepreneur of the Year and the 2011 CASE (Council for the Advancement and Support of Education) European Leadership Award for his entrepreneurial success and outstanding efforts in promoting and supporting education. Wigdortz was also awarded "Charity Principal of the Year" at the Charity Times Awards 2012. He was particularly recognised by the judges "for his vision, tenacity and commitment to social change." The Evening Standard named him one of the 1,000 most influential Londoners. He was appointed an OBE (Officer in the Order of the British Empire) for services to education in the 2013 New Year's Honours list. In 2015, Wigdortz was named one of the "Debrett's 500" most influential people in the UK. In 2016, he received an Honorary Doctorate of Laws from the University of Warwick.

In 2013–2018, Teach First was the largest graduate recruiter in the UK, with over 1,400 new participants a year.

National Citizen Service Trust

In July 2018 Wigdortz was appointed as the chairman of the board of the National Citizen Service (NCS) Trust, the public body responsible for the management of the government's NCS programme, following its reconstitution as a Royal Charter Body.

In July 2021, Wigdortz was re-appointed for another 2 year term. 

In March 2020 the NCS Trust revealed that in 2019 NCS programme participation numbers had fallen for the first time, by 8% year on year to 92,000 having peaked at 100,000 in the year 2018, the last season prior to Wigdortz' assuming his role. The NCS Trust stated that numbers were expected to remain flat in 2020 at 90–95,000 due to delays in the implementation of its new contracts with delivery providers.

Personal life
Wigdortz is married and lives in North London with his three children. He has travelled to over 70 countries in the past 18 years. He has also written a book, about the first decade of Teach First as a guide to other entrepreneurs, entitled Success Against the Odds – Five lessons in how to achieve the impossible; the story of Teach First. It was named WHSmith's Business Book of the Month in September 2012.

References

1973 births
Living people
American nonprofit executives
People from Ocean Township, Monmouth County, New Jersey
University of Richmond alumni
University of Hawaiʻi alumni
McKinsey & Company people